The 1946–47 NCAA men's basketball season began in December 1946, progressed through the regular season and conference tournaments, and concluded with the 1947 NCAA basketball tournament championship game on March 25, 1947, at Madison Square Garden in New York, New York. The Holy Cross Crusaders won their first NCAA national championship with a 58–47 victory over the Oklahoma Sooners.

Season headlines 

 The Mid-American Conference began play, with five original members.
 The Western New York Little Three Conference began play.
 The Yankee Conference began play, with six original members.
 In 1995, the Premo-Porretta Power Poll retroactively selected Kentucky as its national champion for the 1946–47 season.

Conference membership changes

Regular season

Conference winners and tournaments

Statistical leaders

Post-season tournaments

NCAA tournament

Semifinals and finals 

 Third Place – Texas 54, CCNY 50

National Invitation tournament

Semifinals and finals 

 Third Place – NC State 64, West Virginia 52

Awards

Consensus All-American teams

Major player of the year awards 

 Helms Player of the Year: Gerald Tucker, Oklahoma

Other major awards 

 NIT/Haggerty Award (Top player in New York City metro area): Sid Tanenbaum, NYU

Coaching changes 

A number of teams changed coaches during the season and after it ended.

References